Debra DiGiovanni (born March 21, 1972) is a Canadian stand-up comedian originally from Tillsonburg, Ontario.

She is a frequent guest on the CBC Radio program The Debaters, for which she earned a Canadian Comedy Award nomination for writing. Her previous work includes being a regular contributor to Much’s Video on Trial series and its spinoff Stars on Trial, as well as a permanent panelist on The Comedy Network’s Canadian revival of Match Game, among other things.

Personal life 
Debra DiGiovanni was born in Pointe-Claire, Quebec, on March 21, 1972. She is of Italian descent, and was raised in a big Italian family. She grew up in Tillsonburg, Ontario.

DiGiovanni began her studies in university pursuing fashion design, though she admits it was not a fit for her.

Career 
DiGiovanni's comedy career began at the age of 27 with the help of Humber College's inaugural year of their Comedy Writing and Performance course in 1999. Three months into enrolling in the program, she was on stage for the first time. She credits Carol Burnett and Laverne & Shirley (starring Penny Marshall and Cindy Williams) as some of her inspirations. "I watched these women be funny and secretly wanted to do that myself."

In 2002, she won the Canadian Comedy Award for the Best Stand-up Newcomer in Stand Up. In 2003, NOW Magazine named her headline show as the 3rd Best of the Year. In 2005, she made her first appearance at the Just for Laughs Festival where she was invited on a cross-Canada tour opening for Russell Peters. In 2007, 2009, and 2011, she won the Canadian Comedy Award for Best Female Stand Up.

She was previously a contributor on the popular Much show Video on Trial and its spinoff Stars on Trial.

In 2007, she appeared in the fifth season of Last Comic Standing. By winning an audition in Montreal, she was selected to participate in a semifinal qualifying round in Hollywood, making it to the top 10 finalist. She participated in the show until she was eliminated and placed 8th.

Also that year, she hosted the Canadian New Media Awards and the Canadian Comedy Awards. In July 2008, she appeared on eTalk, interviewing contestants on the sixth season of Canadian Idol. She also hosted the Genie Awards alongside Sandra Oh, as well as one night of the Gemini Awards in 2008.

From 2010, she was a permanent panelist on The Comedy Network’s Canadian revival of Match Game.

On February 27, 2018, she performed on Conan.

In 2019, her comedy album Lady Jazz received a Juno Award nomination for Comedy Album of the Year at the Juno Awards of 2019.

In 2022, she was a contestant on LOL: Last One Laughing Canada.

She is presently a frequent guest on the CBC Radio program The Debaters, for which she earned a Canadian Comedy Award nomination for writing.

Filmography

Television

Comedy specials

Awards 

 2001: Nominated for Cream of Comedy award
 2002: Canadian Comedy Award for the Best Stand-up Newcomer in Stand Up.
 2003: NOW Magazine named her headline show as the 3rd Best of the Year.
 2005: Nominated in the Canadian Comedy Awards
 2007, 2009, & 2011: Canadian Comedy Award for Best Female Stand Up.
 2009: Gemini Award for best individual comedy performance
 2019: Her comedy album Lady Jazz received a Juno Award nomination for Comedy Album of the Year at the Juno Awards of 2019.

References

External links
 
 

Canadian people of Italian descent
Canadian stand-up comedians
Last Comic Standing contestants
Living people
People from Pointe-Claire
People from Tillsonburg
Canadian women comedians
Anglophone Quebec people
21st-century Canadian comedians
Comedians from Ontario
Canadian Comedy Award winners
1972 births